This is a list of symphonies in the key of B minor.

References

See also

For symphonies in other keys, see List of symphonies by key.

B minor
 Symphonies